7 Minutes may refer to:
 7 Minutes (2014 film), an American crime thriller drama film
 7 Minutes (2016 film), an Italian-Swiss-French drama film
 7 Minutes (song), a song by Dean Lewis

See also
 Seven Minutes (disambiguation)